Robert Hepburn Macdonald (born 18 July 1965) is a South African former cricketer.

MacDonald was born at Cape Town in October 1965. He studied in England at Durham University, before undertaking his post-graduate studies at Keble College, Oxford. While studying at Oxford, he made his debut in first-class cricket for Oxford University against Hampshire at Oxford in 1991. He played first-class cricket for Oxford until 1993, making a total of nineteen first-class appearances. Playing as a right-arm medium-fast bowler, he took 31 wickets at an average of 38.93, with best figures of 5 for 20. These figures, which was his only first-class five wicket haul, came against Middlesex in 1993. He also made a single first-class appearance for the Combined Universities cricket team against the touring Australians.  In addition to playing first-class cricket while at Oxford, he also made three List A one-day appearances for the Combined Universities, making four appearances in the 1991 Benson & Hedges Cup and a single appearance in the 1993 Benson & Hedges Cup. taking 9 wickets at an average of 26.22. His best figures of 6 for 36 came against Gloucestershire on his List A debut. He took no more than a single wicket in his other five List A matches.

References

External links

1965 births
Living people
People from Cape Town
Alumni of Durham University
Alumni of Keble College, Oxford
South African cricketers
Oxford University cricketers
British Universities cricketers
Alumni of Rondebosch Boys' High School